The European Federation for Animal Science or EAAP ([sic]) The European  Federation for Animal Science or EAAP is an international non-governmental organisation  which aims to improve the knowledge and the dissemination of advancement of animal science. The federation has its headquarters in Rome, Italy.

Presidents

Study Commissions 
 Animal Genetics
 Animal Health and Welfare
 Animal Nutrition
 Animal Physiology
 Livestock Farming Systems
 Cattle
 Horse
 Pig
 Sheep and Goat
 Insects
 Precision Livestock Farming

European Projects 
EAAP is involved in several European projects, with the aim to promote knowledge and dissemination of research results about animal farming. EAAP participated in more than twenty international projects, and currently in BovReg, PPILOW, GENE-SwitCH, Smarter, SmartCow, GENTORE, VetBioNet.

Workshops 
Workshops have been held since 2016. Recent workshops EAAP jointly coordinated are Advancia Academy, in cooperation with Adisseo, Amino Acid Academy, in cooperation with Ajinomoto, and Animine Academy, in cooperation with Animine. They all focus on animal nutrition.

Awards 
The EAAP awards the A.M. Leroy Fellowship.

References

Environmental organisations based in Italy
Agricultural organisations based in Italy
Agrarian politics
Conservation and environmental foundations
Foundations based in Italy
International scientific organizations based in Europe